Votel is a surname. Notable people with the surname include:

Andy Votel, English electronic musician
Joseph Votel (born 1958), United States Army general

See also
Vogel (surname)